Zengjia is a town of Shapingba district, Chongqing, China. It is bordered by Chenjiaqiao subdistrict to the east, Jiulongpo district to the south, Bicheng subdistrict of Bishan, Chongqing Campus town to the north. Wen Qiang who was the former Master Chieftain of the Gang trials and the former deputy police commissioner of Chongqing was born here.

Zengjia was the former administrative division of Ba County, or Baxian. The county was dissolved in March 1995, the portion of the former Baxian was formed the new Banan district, Just at this time, Zengjia was changed under the jurisdiction of Shapingba.

References

Township-level divisions of Chongqing
Shapingba District